Tahitian or Tahitians may refer to:
 someone or something from or associated with the island of Tahiti
 Tahitians, people with an indigenous Tahitian or ethnic identity
 Tahitian language, an Eastern Polynesian language used as a lingua franca in much of French Polynesia
 Tahitian mythology, their ancient folk religion

See also